Ronald L. Flemons (born October 20, 1979) is a former gridiron football defensive lineman. He attended John Marshall High School and Texas A&M University. Flemons was drafted in the seventh round of the 2001 NFL Draft, 226th overall, by the Atlanta Falcons. He spent brief stints with several NFL teams before signing on in the CFL in 2006.

Professional career 
After being selected by the Atlanta Falcons in the seventh round of the 2001 NFL Draft, Flemons dressed for one game that season. In 2002, he briefly joined the New Orleans Saints before returning to Atlanta and appearing in four games. He did not make the regular season squad for Atlanta in 2003, and he signed with the Miami Dolphins the following year, playing in one game. He was traded to the Seattle Seahawks in 2005, but he was placed on waivers before making an appearance.

Flemons was signed as a free agent with the Toronto Argonauts on January 6, 2006, and released as a final training camp cut on June 10 but returned in Week 5, making his CFL regular season debut dressing as backup defensive end and playing special teams. He was traded to the Saskatchewan Roughriders on March 5, 2008, along with Glenn January, Toronto's first round selection in the 2008 CFL Draft and Toronto's second round selection in the 2010 CFL Draft in exchange for Kerry Joseph and Saskatchewan's third round pick in the 2010 Canadian Draft.  On July 7, 2008, Flemons was traded back to the Argonauts along with a 5th round pick in the 2011 Canadian College Draft for receiver T. J. Acree, the rights to Brian Smith, and a 3rd round pick in the 2011 draft.

On January 25, 2013, Flemons was released by the Argonauts.

Notes

External links 
 CFL.ca profile

1979 births
Living people
American players of Canadian football
Atlanta Falcons players
Canadian football defensive linemen
Miami Dolphins players
Players of American football from San Antonio
Players of Canadian football from San Antonio
Saskatchewan Roughriders players
Texas A&M Aggies football players
Toronto Argonauts players